It's Gonna Be a Long Night may refer to:

"It's Gonna Be a Long Night", a song by Human Nature
"It's Gonna Be a Long Night", a song by Ween